The Yellow Line, also known as the Kaohsiung Metropolitan line, is a planned medium capacity rapid transit line on the Kaohsiung Metro. The line has been approved by the Executive Yuan in March 2022, and construction is expected to start in late 2022.

History
The initial plan of the yellow line was first seen in 2002 when the whole MRT construction plan for Kaohsiung was being re-sketched.

By the spring of 2015, director Wu Yi-Long (吳義隆) of the Kaohsiung City Government's  addressed to the local parliament that the yellow line was undergoing feasibility assessment whose route was likely a combination of the old-drafted yellow line and Brown Line, which was hoped to be the second circular public transportation line across Kaohsiung City preceded by the first circular line in Kaohsiung and the whole nation.

On 14 February 2017, four members of the Legislative Yuan representing Kaohsiung and affiliated with the Democratic Progressive Party, namely Liu Shyh-fang, and Hsu Chih-chieh had held a joint press conference unveiling the new draft of the route for the yellow line and asked the Executive Yuan to approve the plan, whose bid was later agreed and approved by the yuan to be included in on March 23.
。

On March 27, a few days after the approval of the Executive Yuan's approval, the local MRT bureau submitted the feasibility study of the yellow line to the authorities concerned of the central government.
In the study, the line was planned to be an underground system whose route combines the previously planned Brown Line, Fongshan Line, and Wujia section of the Green Line.

In March 2022, the Executive Yuan approved the construction of the line.

Stations

The following graph is the route map for the drafted yellow line only, except other intersecting lines like Green Line and Silver Line.

According to the plan, the yellow line has two start points from Cruise Terminal and MRT Cianjhen Senior High School Station respectively and an end point at Dipu township, Niaosong District, Kaohsiung City. The part begins from Y1 to Y15 is also called Jiangong-Minzu (建工民族) Line while the section between Y1 and Y23 is called Chenching-Wujia (澄清五甲) Line.

Please note that the Station names and locations are tentatively planned.

See also
 Rapid transit in Taiwan
Taipei Metro
Kaohsiung Rapid Transit
 Taoyuan Metro
Taichung Metro

References

External links
Transportation bureau, Kaohsiung City Government, 

Kaohsiung Metro